Guru Gobind Singh Refinery (GGSR) is a private sector refinery owned by HPCL-Mittal Energy Limited (HMEL) , a joint venture between HPCL and Mittal Energy Investment Pte Ltd, Singapore, a company owned by L N Mittal. It is located in  village Phullokhari at distance of 2 Km from Raman Mandi, Bathinda, Punjab, India. It is the tenth biggest refinery in India.

The work for refinery started in 2008 and the refinery became operational in March 2012. Its annual capacity is 11.3 Million tons (230,000 barrels per day). It was built at a cost of $4 billion. The refinery gets its crude oil supply from Mundra, a coastal town in Gujarat, through a 1,017 km pipeline where the oil is imported from abroad.

Engineers India Limited (EIL) as the Project Management Consultancy (PMC) has done Engineering (design), Procurement and Construction Management for the entire  job.

References

External links
HPCL-Mittal Energy Ltd

Oil refineries in India
Energy in Punjab, India
Bathinda district
Memorials to Guru Gobind Singh
Hindustan Petroleum
Hindustan Petroleum buildings and structures
2012 establishments in Punjab, India
Industrial buildings completed in 2012